The First Mori Cabinet briefly governed Japan between April and July 2000, after the sudden incapacitation of Prime Minister Keizō Obuchi and his replacement by Yoshirō Mori, who had been LDP Secretary General. Mori called his government "the Japan revival cabinet", but made no personnel changes when he took office, pledging to retain Obuchi's ministers, maintain the 3-party coalition and continue his policies to try to revive the economy.

Mori proved an unpopular Prime Minister due to a series of gaffes and the manner of his coming to power, and called early general elections for June 2000 to pre-empt a continuing decline in the LDP's poll numbers. In the elections, the LDP lost the majority that it had built up through opposition defections since 1996, but the coalition held enough seats to retain government. Therefore, the cabinet was dissolved in July when Mori was re-elected by the National Diet and replaced with the Second Mori Cabinet.

Election of the Prime Minister

Ministers 

R = Member of the House of Representatives
C = Member of the House of Councillors

Cabinet

References

External links 
Pages at the Kantei (English website):
 Mori Administration 
 List of Ministers

Cabinet of Japan
2000 establishments in Japan
2000 disestablishments in Japan
Cabinets established in 2000
Cabinets disestablished in 2000